Theatre Formation Paribartak is a group theatre situated in the Howrah district of West Bengal, India. It produces short theatres, one-act plays and full-length plays in Bengali, English and Hindi. Its performances are held in prosceniums, intimate spaces, streets and in virtual platforms. It also organizes workshops for its own actors. Before May 2005, it was a unit of another organization that now goes under the name of Changers' Foundation Paribartak.

Plays

List of plays
The group produces mainly one-act Bengali plays. Its productions include:
 Waiting For Godot (inspired by Samuel Beckett's play Waiting For Godot)
 Ekdin Rattire (একদিন রাত্তিরে), means One Day in The Night
 Fasad (ফসাদ), means The Problem (Hindi-Bengali bilingual)
 Kaman (কামান), means The Cannon
 Godot Waits For Homeland Security (produced in English, written by Martin Kimeldorf, later replaced by Anusaran, the Bengali adaptation)
 Piano, after a story by Anibal Machado
 Pedro Páramo, after the novel by Juan Rulfo
 Danawala Ekta Buro (ডানাওয়ালা একটা বুড়ো), means An Old Man with Wings, after a story by Gabriel García Marquez
 Stalingrad 1942
 Endgame (inspired by Samuel Beckett's play Endgame)
 Anusaran (অনুসরণ), means Following, inspired by Godot Waits For Homeland Security written by Martin Kimeldorf
 Dhundhumar (ধুন্ধুমার), means The Hullabaloo
 Rabindra Panchak (রবীন্দ্র পঞ্চক, a collection of five skits written by Rabindranath Tagore)
 No Exit (Bengali-English bilingual play inspired by Jean-Paul Sartre's play No Exit)
 Bandarnach (বান্দরনাচ), means Monkey Dance (Hindi-Bengali-English trilingual)
 Mayabari The Grand House of Illusion (মায়াবাড়ি দ্য গ্র্যাণ্ড হাউস অফ ইলিউশন, Bengali-English bilingual play inspired by Jean Genet's play The Balcony)
 Lakshmaner Shaktishel (লক্ষ্মণের শক্তিশেল, written by Sukumar Ray; a site-specific theatre production presented in the compound of Pathuriaghata Ghoshbari, Kolkata)
 Himmatwala (হিম্মতওয়ালা), means The Courageous
 Robir Tinti Hasi (রবির তিনটি হাসি, a collection of three skits written by Rabindranath Tagore)
 Metamorphosis (inspired by the novella The Metamorphosis written by Franz Kafka, produced in English)
 Sthananko (স্থানাঙ্ক), means The Coordinates
 Ghater Katha (ঘাটের কথা, inspired by the short story of the same name written by Rabindranath Tagore), means Tale of Riverside Steps
 The Visit (inspired by the play written by Friedrich Dürrenmatt, produced in English)
 Ekti Uttar Adhunik Samajik Pala (একটি উত্তর-আধুনিক সামাজিক পালা), means A Post-Modern Social Drama
 The Reality Show, produced in Bengali
 Nainam Dahati Pavakah (নৈনং দহতি পাবকঃ), means Fire can't burn it, inspired by Ray Bradbury's novel Fahrenheit 451
 Gimpel The Fool (a transversion of the short story Gimpel the Fool written by Isaac Bashevis Singer, produced in English)
 Apocalypse (loosely inspired by the novel Khelnanagar written by Nabarun Bhattacharya, produced in English)
 Charai (চড়াই), means The Sparrow
 The Old Man and The Sea (inspired by the novella of the same name written by Ernest Hemingway, produced in English)
 Joker (based on Blowup as written by Julio Cortázar and filmed by Michelangelo Antonioni, produced in Bengali)
 Confusion (produced in Bengali, 12 minutes)
 Putul (পুতুল), means The Doll
 Love, Food, Nation a.k.a. Mutton Cutlet (produced in English)
 Jot (জট), means Tangled
 Bukhar (बुखार), means The Fever, 12 minutes
 Freedom (produced in English)
 Tick (produced in Bengali, 10 minutes)
 Tock (produced in Bengali, 10 minutes)
 Imaginarium (Text-based Virtual Reality Theatre, a WhatsApp drama, in English)
 Moyla (ময়লা), means Dirt (a virtual live theatre, in Bengali)

Other productions
Non-participative development theatres produced by Theatre Formation Paribartak include Tia (for encouraging people to donate blood to blood banks) and Roopkatha (for promotion of the Child Helpline no. 1098).

Theatre Formation Paribartak has also produced Machhi (মাছি) written by Mohit Chattopadhyay and two more street-theatres - Machine (written by Safdar Hashmi) and Jhilik (ঝিলিক) but it does not run these productions.

The theatres Lakshmaner Shaktishel, Himmatwala, Ekti Uttar Adhunik Samajik Pala, Pratahkritya and Titumir were produced by an autonomous body of freelancing actors and technicians brought together by Theatre Formation Paribartak and facilitated by Joyraj Bhattacharjee.

Avoiding attribution
In the above list, if not otherwise mentioned, plays are written by members of Theatre Formation Paribartak, whose names are not generally disclosed by the organization. They also avoid mentioning the names of their directors who are also members of the group. Unlike many other theatre groups, it not been associated exclusively with a famous theatre personality or any one person. It also prefers to avoid mentioning the names of its performers and technicians.

Awards
The theatres of Theatre Formation Paribartak, since its inception in 2001, have won the following awards:
 2003 - Waiting For Godot - 2nd Best Production - in an All Bengal One Act Bengali Drama Competition organized in Howrah
 2005 - Danawala Ekta Buro - Best Actress: Debasri Saha in the role of Maria - in an All Bengal One Act Bengal Drama Competition organized in Howrah
 2008 - Kaman - Special Recognition Prize for Acting: Debmita Sen in the role of The Daughter - in a Multilingual Short Drama Competition Festival organized in Kolkata
 2009 - Anusaran - Best Production - in a District-level One Act Bengali Drama Competition organized in Howrah, Best Actor: Amajit Basu in the role of the United States Department of Homeland Security Agent - in a District-level One Act Bengali Drama Competition organized in Howrah, Best Co-actor: Debdip Sen in the role of An American Citizen - in a District-level One Act Bengali Drama Competition organized in Howrah
 2010 - Danawala Ekta Buro - Best Actress: Koyel Ghosh in the role of Maria - in a Multilingual Short Drama Competition Festival organized in Kolkata
 2010 - Anusaran - 2nd Best Production - in an All Bengal One Act Bengali Drama Competition organized in Howrah
 2011 - No Exit - Special Recognition Prize for Production - in a Multilingual Short Drama Competition Festival organized in Kolkata, Best Actor: Amajit Basu in the role of Robin Chatterjee (Garcin) - in a Multilingual Short Drama Competition Festival organized in Kolkata, Best Actress: Koyel Ghosh in the role of Nina Roy (Estelle) - in a Multilingual Short Drama Competition Festival organized in Kolkata
 2012 - Danawala Ekta Buro - 3rd Best Production - in an All Bengal One Act Bengali Drama Competition organized in Howrah
 2012 - Mayabari The Grand House of Illusion - Best Production - in a Multilingual Short Drama Competition Festival organized in Kolkata, Best Actor: Amajit Basu in the role of Thor - in a Multilingual Short Drama Competition Festival organized in Kolkata
 2013 - Metamorphosis - Best Production - in a Multilingual Short Drama Competition Festival organized in Kolkata, Best Director: Amajit Basu - in a Multilingual Short Drama Competition Festival organized in Kolkata
 2014 - The Visit - 2nd Best Production - in a Multilingual Short Drama Competition Festival organized in Kolkata, Best Actor: Amajit Basu - in a Multilingual Short Drama Competition Festival organized in Kolkata, Best Dramatist (Script): Amajit Basu - in a Multilingual Short Drama Competition Festival organized in Kolkata
 2014 - Kaman - 2nd Best Production - in an All Bengal One Act Bengali Drama Competition organized in Howrah
 2015 - Pedro Páramo - Best Director: Amajit Basu - in an All Bengal Full Length Drama Competition organized in Howrah, Best Actor: Amajit Basu - in an All Bengal Full Length Drama Competition organized in Howrah
 2015 - Gimpel The Fool - Best Production - in a Multilingual Short Drama Competition Festival organized in Kolkata, Best Direction: Amajit Basu - in a Multilingual Short Drama Competition Festival organized in Kolkata, Best Actor: Amajit Basu - in a Multilingual Short Drama Competition Festival organized in Kolkata
 2016 - Apocalypse - 3rd Best Production - in a Multilingual Short Drama Competition Festival organized in Kolkata, Special Recognition Award for Child Actor: Ms. Zohareen Basu in the role of Gina - in a Multilingual Short Drama Competition Festival organized in Kolkata
 2017 - The Old Man and The Sea - Best Dramatist (Script): Amajit Basu - in a Multilingual Short Drama Competition Festival organized in Kolkata
 2018 - Love, Food, Nation a.k.a. Mutton Cutlet - Best Production - in a Multilingual Short Drama Competition Festival organized in Kolkata, Best Director: Dr. Amajit Basu - in a Multilingual Short Drama Competition Festival organized in Kolkata, Best Actor: Mr. Amajit Basu in the role of The Waiter - in a Multilingual Short Drama Competition Festival organized in Kolkata
 2019 - Freedom - Best Production - in a Multilingual Short Drama Competition Festival organized in Kolkata, Best Director: Dr. Amajit Basu - in a Multilingual Short Drama Competition Festival organized in Kolkata

References

External links 
The Website of Theatre Formation Paribartak
Performance by Theatre Formation Paribartak of Ekdin Rattire on World Theater Day 2014
Performance by Theatre Formation Paribartak on World Theater Day 2015
Performance by Theatre Formation Paribartak of Sthananko in March 2015
Pre-production review of Ekti Uttar Adhunik Samajik Pala of Theatre Formation Paribartak, Ei Samay , 24 January 2015

Theatrical organisations in India
Theatres in India
Howrah district
Bengali theatre groups
2001 establishments in West Bengal
Organizations established in 2001